Hugh Ferris (6 December 1877 – 17 July 1929) was a South African international rugby union player who played as a half-back.

He made 1 appearance for South Africa in 1903.

References

South African rugby union players
South Africa international rugby union players
1877 births
1929 deaths
Rugby union players from County Down
Rugby union halfbacks
Sportspeople from Newry
Ireland international rugby union players